John Vandeleur Stewart (4 October 1802 - 1872) was an Irish
naturalist, ornithologist and bird collector.

John Vandeleur Stewart lived at Rockhill, Letterkenny. He was a landowner and a Member of the Carlton Club.  He was High Sheriff of Donegal in 1838.

Works
(1832) A list of, and remarks on, some of the mammalious animals, and the birds, met with in the three years preceding December 4, 1828 on the Northern coast of Donegal Loudon's Magazine of Natural History  5:584 (1832)  
contributions to The Natural History of Ireland

External links
The Peerage

High Sheriffs of Donegal
Irish ornithologists
1802 births
1872 deaths